Andy Capp is a British comic strip character. 

Andy Capp may also refer to:

Andy Capp (TV series), a 1988 sitcom based on the comic strip
Andy Capp, a 1981 stage musical by Alan Price, based on the comic strip
Andy Capp's, a brand of snack product sold under the character's name
Lynford Anderson, Jamaican musician and recording engineer who recorded as Andy Capp
Andy Capp: The Game, a 1988 platform game for the Commodore 64

See also
Andy Kapp, German curler